The Ascocerida are comparatively small, bizarre Orthoceratoids known only from Ordovician and Silurian sediments in Europe and North America, uniquely characterized by a deciduous conch consisting of a longiconic juvenile portion and an inflated breviconic adult portion that separate sometime in maturity.

Morphology
The juvenile portion of an ascocerid consists typically of a narrow, circular cyrtocone that underwent periodic truncation. The siphuncle is located half way between the shell axis and the venter, is thin walled and tubular with short, orthochoanitic septal necks and segments that are only slightly inflated. The juvenile portion is known as the deciduous conch, as it is shed in a similar manner to deciduous trees losing their leaves.

The adult, or mature ascoceroid conch, as it is referred to, typically consists of an expanded exogastric brevicone with unique features. The apical end is formed by the septum of truncation which is about three times as thick as normal internal septa and about as thick as the external shell itself. The septa become confined to the dorsal side of the shell resulting in a series of dorsal chambers, or camerae, that provided stabilizing buoyancy.

The ascocerid shell, or conch, is the thinnest and most fragile of any orthocone or cyrtocone of comparable size, which accounts for their rarity. Often it is only the mature, ascoceroid portion that is found.

Derivation and phylogeny
The Ascocerida are derived from the michelinocerid family Clinocertidae in the early Middle Ordovician, possibly from Clinoceras through such slender forms as Montyoceras and Hebetoceras. The connection between these slender deciduous forms and the typically ascoceroid Probillingsites from the early Upper Ordovician can be made through the slightly inflated Redpathoceras.

A phylogenetic sequence can be seen in the Ascoceratidae, from Probillingsites through Schucertoceras, then Billingsites, in the Upper Ordovician, and finally to the middle and upper Silurian Ascoceras. Changes involve the arrangement and complexity of septa in the mature conch and in its shape, ending with the more elongate and compressed mature Ascoceras.

The Choanoceratidae is established for the derived Upper Silurian Choanoceras, characterized by septa that form deep symmetrical cones and a subcentral expanded siphuncle with cyrtochoanitic and recumbent septal necks at maturity. The middle and possible upper Ordovician ancestral forms are placed in the Hebetoceratidae, which includes the orthoconic Hebetoceras and cyrtoconic Montyoceras.

Paleoecology
The fully mature breviconic ascocerid, with the juvenile longiconic portion discarded was no doubt a facile swimmer. The dorsal chambers would have provided a stable center of buoyancy directly above the center of gravity with the shell in a horizontal orientation. The hyponomic sinus, observed in some, indicates active, directionally controlled hydro-jet propulsion. Just how maneuverable these creatures were is another matter as is how high in the water column they spent their time.

How juvenile forms spent their time is less obvious. Juvenile shells are found in the same location as adult, indicating they lived in the same area. Juvenile ascocerids were probably more benthic than their adult counterparts, perhaps spending their time at or on the sea floor.

References

Additional sources

Cephalopod orders
Orthoceratoidea
Ordovician first appearances
Silurian extinctions